The Perfect Date is a 2019 American teen romantic comedy film, directed by Chris Nelson from a screenplay by Steve Bloom and Randall Green. It is based on the novel The Stand-In by Steve Bloom, published by Carolrohda Lab in October 2017. The film stars Noah Centineo, Laura Marano, Camila Mendes, Odiseas Georgiadis and Matt Walsh. It was released on April 12, 2019, by Netflix.

Plot 
Brooks Rattigan is a high school senior, with dreams of getting into Yale, while his father, Charlie wants him to go to the University of Connecticut, which offered Brooks a full scholarship. He works at a sub shop with his best friend, programmer Murph, but financing his college dreams proves troubling. Brooks seizes the opportunity to make some extra money by posing as the boyfriend of his classmate's wealthy cousin Celia Lieberman of Greenwich. He finds he has a knack for dating with his adaptable personality. He meets beautiful but snobby Shelby and makes it his goal to win her over. Celia lies to Shelby and tells her Brooks is from Darien rather than working class Bridgeport.

He and Murph launch an app, selling himself as the plus-one for all occasions. After finding out that Celia has a crush on Franklin Volley, they set up a plan to fake break-up, in which each of them gets to be with Shelby and Franklin respectively. As business booms for Brooks, Murph feels neglected and cuts Brooks off. Celia sets up an interview for Brooks at Yale, and is upset when she finds out that he researched the Dean previously and lied to him in order to be liked. Brooks justifies it, saying that it is no different from what he has been doing with his app.

Celia realizes that Franklin is not the person for her, however does not tell Brooks. When they conduct their fake break up, she is hurt by his words, and slaps him. Brooks is under the impression that it is all an act.

Following the "break-up", Shelby kisses Brooks and asks him to accompany her to her school formal. The two find it difficult to relate to one another and struggle to hold a conversation. At the formal, Brooks sees Leah, a girl who had used his app to "practice dating." She reveals all about Brooks' app to Shelby, who is offended and disgusted by the theme of Brooks' app. He reveals to Shelby that he is not from the wealthy town that she believes he is from, and that he needs the money to go to Yale. She calls him a liar and leaves.

Brooks approaches Celia, who was also at the dance. She declines his offer to dance, and says that she is not a backup. He returns home and talks to his dad about what has been going on in his life. His dad reminds him that nobody truly knows who they are, and admits to Brooks that he is proud of who his son is becoming.

Brooks decides to accept UConn's offer, because if he has to pretend to be somebody else to go to Yale, he does not want to go. Brooks makes up with Murph. He also meets up with Celia and writes a letter to her, where he reflects on how his previous ambitions were to drive the fanciest car, go to the nicest school, and date the prettiest girl. But he has revealed that these ambitions made him a bad friend, an ungrateful son, and a self-obsessed person. He writes that the times when he felt the most himself was when he was with Celia and wants to be with her.

Celia visits Brooks at home and apologizes for slapping him. The two then go to the sub sandwich restaurant which has been retrofitted for a party, with Murph and Tuna Melt (Murph's crush and regular customer of the sub shop) in attendance. Murph reveals his admission to UConn and Brooks reconciles with Celia, sharing a kiss. The four then continue to dance until the end of the film.

Cast 

 Noah Centineo as Brooks Rattigan
 Laura Marano as Celia Lieberman
 Odiseas Georgiadis as Murph
 Camila Mendes as Shelby Pace
 Matt Walsh as Charlie Rattigan
 Joe Chrest as Jerry Lieberman
 Carrie Lazar as Lilian Lieberman
 Alex Biglane as Tuna Melt on Seven Grain
 Blaine Kern III as Franklin
 Zak Steiner as Reece
 Ty Parker as Cartelli
 Wayne Péré as Mr. Newhouse
 Autumn Walker as Leah
 Ivan Hoey Jr. as Larry

Production
In March 2018, it was announced Noah Centineo, Camila Mendes, Laura Marano, Matt Walsh and Odiseas Georgiadis had joined the cast of the film, then titled The Stand-In after its source novel, with Chris Nelson directing from a screenplay by Steve Bloom and Randall Green. In January 2019, it was reported that Netflix had acquired worldwide distribution rights to the film, retitled The Perfect Date.

Principal photography began in March 2018, in New Orleans.

Release
The Perfect Date was released on April 12, 2019. In July 2019, Netflix reported that the film was viewed by 48 million households in its first four weeks of release.

Reception
The website's critical consensus reads, "Though it may not be the perfect romcom, The Perfect Date endearing leads still manage to show viewers a fun — if overly familiar — time."

References

External links

2010s high school films
2019 romantic comedy films
2010s teen comedy films
2010s teen romance films
American high school films
American romantic comedy films
American teen comedy films
American teen romance films
Awesomeness Films films
Films about online dating
Films shot in New Orleans
English-language Netflix original films
2019 films
2010s English-language films
2010s American films